Gabriel Bracho (born 25 May 1915 in Los Puertos de Altagracia, Zulia, died 6 March 1995 in Caracas) was a Venezuelan artist. He and César Rengifo were major exponents of the social realism artistic movement in Venezuela.  His work is permeated by social, political and historical themes. 

From 1936 to 1939 he studied at the Academy of Fine Arts in Caracas and he continued his studies at the Escuela de Artes Aplicadas in Chile until 1942. In 1943 he began a tour of various countries including the USA, Bolivia, Argentina, Uruguay and Italy which culminated in him living and working in Paris. 

Initially influenced by the impressionists, expressionists and cubists he embraced the nationalistic and revolutionary trends of the Mexican muralists. He returned to Venezuela in 1950 and exhibited in the Caracas Museum of Fine Arts.  In 1951 he exhibited at the museum of fine arts in Caracas and in 1953 he completed work on his first major mural Venezuela (now destroyed).  He traveled to Mexico where he met and compared notes with his friends Diego Rivera and David Alfaro Siqueiros amongst others, and in 1957 he exhibited his work at the palace of fine art in Mexico City.  

In 1958, he returned to Venezuela and with others founded the Taller de Arte Realista group.  In 1960 he completed the mural Cuba located in La Casa de las Américas in Habana. 

In 1976 he won the first prize at the Exposición de Pintura Realista Comprometida in Bulgaria and in 1986 was awarded the Armando Reveron prize.

In 1994 he held a major exhibition in the Venezuelan national gallery and in the same year was awarded the prestigious National Prize of Plastic Arts of Venezuela. 
 
He died in Caracas on 6 March 1995.

His main works include Nochebuena de los Negros, Tierra, Stalingrado, Petróleo, Horoshima, El Abanderado, Manifestación and the murals Venezuela (1952–1953), Lino de Clemente (1966–1967), Diversiones, Venezuela (1971–1972), and Boyacá (1983) located in the presidential palace Miraflores.  

His home in Los Puertos de Altagracia is now a museum dedicated to his memory and work.

References

Citations

Other Sources
 El Realismo Social en la Pintura 1940-1950 by Simon Noriega (Pub Universidad de los Andes Consejo de Publicaciones Mérida Venezuela)
 Alfredo Boulton and his Contemporaries: Critical Dialogues in Venezuelan Art,1912-1974 by Ariel Jimenez, Hugo Achugar, Roldan Estera-Grillet and Elias Iturrieta, (2008, Ed Ariel Jimenez, Pub The Museum of Modern Art New York)
 Gabriel Bracho

1915 births
1995 deaths
Venezuelan artists